Rudka  is a village in Bielsk County, Podlaskie Voivodeship, in north-eastern Poland. It is the seat of the gmina (administrative district) called Gmina Rudka.

The village has a population of 1,400.

Local attractions 
 Ossoliński Palace - eighteenth century baroque architecture. Built in 1763, rebuilt in the years 1913–1914, the so-called 'New palace " of about 1930. Orangery brick from the second half of the eighteenth century, brick and wood buildings and czworaki from the nineteenth and twentieth in, park, 1763;

References

Rudka